Pedro de Ágreda Sánchez Martín, O.P. (also known simply as Pedro Sánchez Martín or Pedro de Ágreda) (died 1580) was a Roman Catholic prelate who served as Bishop of Coro (1561–1580).

Biography
Pedro de Ágreda Sánchez Martín was born in Agreda, Spain and ordained a priest in the Order of Preachers.
On 27 June 1561, he was appointed during the papacy of Pope Pius IV as Bishop of Coro.
On 10 June 1565, he was consecrated bishop by Juan de los Barrios, Archbishop of Santafé en Nueva Granada, with Juan de Simancas Simancas, Bishop of Cartagena, serving as co-consecrator.
He served as Bishop of Coro until his death in 1580.

References

External links and additional sources
 (for Chronology of Bishops) 
 (for Chronology of Bishops) 

16th-century Roman Catholic bishops in Venezuela
Bishops appointed by Pope Pius IV
1580 deaths
Dominican bishops
Roman Catholic bishops of Coro